Street Scene is a 1931 American pre-Code drama film produced by Samuel Goldwyn and directed by King Vidor. With a screenplay by Elmer Rice adapted from his Pulitzer Prize-winning play of the same name, Street Scene takes place on a New York City street from one evening until the following afternoon. Except for one scene which takes place inside a taxi, Vidor shot the entire film on a single set depicting half a city block of house fronts.

The film stars Estelle Taylor, David Landau, Sylvia Sidney, William Collier, Jr., and Beulah Bondi (her screen debut). The music score is by Alfred Newman, his first complete film score. Newman composed the eponymous title theme, in the style of George Gershwin's Rhapsody in Blue. The theme has been used in  other movies, including Cry of the City, Kiss of Death, I Wake Up Screaming, Where the Sidewalk Ends, The Dark Corner, Gentleman's Agreement and as the overture to How to Marry a Millionaire.

In February 2020, the film was shown at the 70th Berlin International Film Festival, as part of a retrospective dedicated to King Vidor's career.

Plot
On a hot summer afternoon on the front stoop of a Lower East Side tenement building, Emma Jones gossips with other neighbors about the affair that Mrs. Anna Maurrant and the milkman Steve Sankey are having. When the rude and unfriendly Mr. Frank Maurrant arrives, they change the subject. Meanwhile, their teenage daughter Rose Maurrant is being sexually pressured by her married boss, Mr. Bert Easter. However, Rose very much likes her kind young Jewish neighbor Sam, who has a serious crush on her.

The next morning, Frank Maurrant tells his wife that he is traveling to Stamford on business. Mrs. Maurrant meets the gentle Sankey in her apartment, but out of the blue Frank comes back home. He realizes his wife is upstairs with Sankey, and runs upstairs. We hear shots and see the two men struggling as Sankey tries to escape through the window. Maurrant runs out with a gun. He has killed Sankey and fatally wounded his wife.

Maurrant is apprehended and is led away by police. He apologizes to his daughter Rose, who will now have to take care of herself and her young brother without either parent. Rose's boss offers once again to set her up in her own apartment, but she refuses. Then she sees Sam, and tells him she wants to leave the city. Sam pleads with her to let him go with her, but she tells him it will be better for the two of them to have a couple of years apart before they consider becoming a couple. Rose walks off down the street by herself.

Cast
The cast is listed here in the order shown in the credits:
Sylvia Sidney as Rose Maurrant
William Collier, Jr. as Sam Kaplan
Estelle Taylor as Mrs. Anna Maurrant
Beulah Bondi as Emma Jones
David Landau as Frank Maurrant
Matt McHugh as Vincent Jones
Russell Hopton as Steve Sankey
Greta Grandstedt as Mae Jones
Eleanor Wesselhoeft as Marguerite "Greta" Fiorentino
Allan Fox as Dick McGann
Nora Cecil as Alice Simpson (welfare worker)
Margaret Robertson in a minor role
Walter James as Marshal James Henry
Max Montor as Abe Kaplan
Walter Miller as Bert Easter (Rose's boss)
T.H. Manning as George Jones
Conway Washburne as Danny Buchanan
John M. Qualen as Karl Olsen
Ann Kostant as Shirley Kaplan
Adele Watson as Olga Olsen
Lambert Rogers as Willie Maurrant
George Humbert as Filippo Fiorentino
Helen Lovett as Laura Hildebrand
Richard Powell as Officer Harry Murphy
Jane Mercer in a minor role
Monti Carter as Monti Carter
Harry Wallace as Fred Cullen

References

External links

1931 films
1931 drama films
Adultery in films
American black-and-white films
American drama films
American films based on plays
1930s English-language films
Films about race and ethnicity
Films directed by King Vidor
Films scored by Alfred Newman
Films set in Manhattan
Films set in New York City
Films shot in New York City
Murder in films
Samuel Goldwyn Productions films
Uxoricide in fiction
United Artists films
1930s American films